Thavam is a 2019 film co-directed by R Vijay Anand and AR Sooriyan, both of whom directed Vilayattu Aarambam. The film stars newcomers Vasi Ashif, Pooja Shree, and Seeman in the lead roles. The film released on 8 November.

Plot
The story is about how three different people - Murugan (Vasi Ashif), Akila (Pooja Shree), and Natesan (Seeman) - come together. There is a subplot of love between Murugan and Akila.

Cast

Production 
After a 6 year hiatus, Seeman was roped in to play the lead roles in Thavam alongside debutantes Vasi and Pooja Shree. He reprises his role as a farmer rights activist from Nagaraja Cholan MA, MLA .

Soundtrack 
Srikanth Deva composed the songs and sang one song. The audio was released on 4 December 2019.

Release 
The film released to negative reviews. The Times of India gave the film 1.5 out of 5 stars and wrote that "The film is also a tad long and tests our patience after a point". The reviewer criticized the comedy scenes, unengaing screenplay, songs, and emotional scenes. Maalaimalar criticized the length of the film. Dinamalar praised the performances of the lead cast.

References

External links 
 

2010s Tamil-language films
2019 films
Indian drama films
Films scored by Srikanth Deva
Films about farmers
2019 drama films